The Texans is a 1938 American Western film directed by James P. Hogan and starring Joan Bennett and Randolph Scott. The screenplay was written by Bertram Millhauser, Paul Sloane and William Wister Haines and is based on the novel North of 36 by Emerson Hough.

Other scenes were filmed near Laredo, Texas. 2500 Texas Longhorns were used for the herd. Interior scenes were recorded at Paramount Studios in Hollywood. The Texans premiered at San Antonio's Majestic Theater on July 16, 1938.

Plot
After the Civil War, the former Confederates of Texas are suffering under harsh taxes, ill treatment and corruption by the Federal Government during the Reconstruction era. Texas ranch owner, Ivy Preston accompanied by her grandmother Granna and her old ranch foreman now the trail boss Chuckawalla is trying to move her cattle to market to sell them. The carpetbaggers are not only trying to seize her cattle without payment but want her ranch as well for their own ends. Ivy's true love, former Confederate officer Alan Sanford is in Mexico with General Shelby's Expedition to Mexico.

A Confederate veteran named Kirk Jordan who has had enough of war and desires to make wealth in America becomes involved with her. He convinces her to drive her cattle to Abilene, Kansas rather than Mexico but he is upset with her when he learns she wants to use the money to help the South continue fighting. Their cattle drive fights the elements, the Comanche and the US Army who follow the orders of the carpetbaggers.

Principal cast
Joan Bennett as  Ivy Preston 
Randolph Scott as  Kirk Jordan 
May Robson as Granna 
Walter Brennan as  Chuckawalla 
Robert Cummings as  Alan Sanford 
Robert Barrat as  Isaiah Middlebrack
Raymond Hatton as  Cal Tuttle
Francis Ford as  Uncle Dud
Harvey Stephens as  Lt. David Nichols
Irving Bacon as  Pvt. Collins

See also 
North of 36 (1924)
The Conquering Horde (1931)

References

External links

NY Times review

1938 films
Films directed by James Patrick Hogan
1938 Western (genre) films
Films shot in Texas
Films set in Texas
American black-and-white films
Films based on American novels
Films based on Western (genre) novels
Remakes of American films
Paramount Pictures films
American Western (genre) films
Films directed by Paul Sloane
1930s English-language films
1930s American films
Films set in 1865